Lophophelma costistrigaria is a moth of the family Geometridae first described by Frederic Moore in 1868. It is found in Guangxi, China.

References

Moths described in 1868
Pseudoterpnini